The first round of AFC matches for 2018 FIFA World Cup qualification (and 2019 AFC Asian Cup qualification) was played from 12 to 23 March 2015.

Format
A total of twelve teams (teams ranked 35–46 in the AFC entrant list) played home-and-away over two legs. The six winners advanced to the second round.

Seeding
The draw for the first round was held on 10 February 2015, 15:30 MST (UTC+8), at the AFC House in Kuala Lumpur, Malaysia.

The seeding was based on the FIFA World Rankings of January 2015 (shown in parentheses below). The 12 teams were seeded into two pots:
Pot A contained the teams ranked 1–6 (i.e., 35–40 in the AFC entrant list).
Pot B contained the teams ranked 7–12 (i.e., 41–46 in the AFC entrant list).

Each tie contained a team from Pot A and a team from Pot B, with the team from Pot A hosting the first leg.

Note: Bolded teams qualified for the second round.

Summary
|}

Notes

Matches

India won 2–0 on aggregate and advanced to the second round.

Yemen won 3–1 on aggregate and advanced to the second round.

Timor-Leste won the first leg 4–1 and the second leg 1–0, thus winning 5–1 on aggregate and advancing to the Second round. On 12 December 2017 FIFA awarded both matches 3–0 to Mongolia due to Timor-Leste fielding numerous ineligible players. However, this was long after the Second round had been played, so Timor-Leste advanced and Mongolia were not reinstated.

Cambodia won 4–1 on aggregate and advanced to the second round.

Chinese Taipei won 2–1 on aggregate and advanced to the second round.

Bhutan won 3–1 on aggregate and advanced to the second round.

Goalscorers
There were 24 goals scored in 12 matches, for an average of  goals per match.

2 goals

 Chencho Gyeltshen
 Chan Vathanaka
 Sunil Chhetri
 Chiquito do Carmo

1 goal

 Tshering Dorji
 Adi Said
 Khoun Laboravy
 Thierry Bin
 Chu En-le
 Wang Rui
 Leong Ka Hang
 Batmönkhiin Erkhembayar
 Hassan Bashir
 Subash Madushan
 Patrick Fabiano
 Jairo Neto
 Rodrigo Silva
 Abdulwasea Al-Matari
 Ala Al-Sasi
 Mohammed Boqshan

Notes

References

External links

Qualifiers – Asia: Round 1, FIFA.com
FIFA World Cup, the-AFC.com
, the-AFC.com
Preliminary Joint Qualification 2018, stats.the-AFC.com

1
1
Qual1